This is a list of notable Australian photojournalists. For photojournalists of other nationalities, see list of photojournalists.

Australian photojournalists

 David Adams (born 1963), photojournalist and documentary film maker
 Narelle Autio (born 1969), photographer
 Patrick Brown (born 1969), photographer
 Daniel Berehulak (born 1975), photographer, photojournalist
 Ernest Gustav Brandon-Cremer (1895–1957)
 Jeff Carter (1928–2010), photographer, author
 Suzanna Clarke (born 1961), photographer, author,  journalist
 Chantal Dunbar (born 1967), author, photojournalist
 Neil Davis (1934–1985), photojournalist, cameraman, on combat
 John Englart (born 1955), photojournalist,  journalist
 John Everingham (born 1949),  journalist
 Jim Fenwick (1934–2021), photographer, photojournalist
 Ashley Gilbertson (born 1978), photographer, on  war
 John Raymond Garrett (born 1940),  journalist, on fashion
 Kate Geraghty (born 1972), photographer, photojournalist
 Frank Hurley (1885–1962), photographer, on expeditions
 Lyn Hancock, photographer, author, photojournalist, on wildlife
 Sam Hood (1872–1953), photographer, photojournalist
 Paul B. Kidd (1945–2021), photojournalist, radio host, author
 Damien Parer (1912–1944), photographer, on  war
 Trent Parke (born 1971), photographer
 Willie Phua (born 1928)
 Francis Reiss (1927-2017), photographer
 Steven Siewert (born 1964), photographer, photojournalist
 Tracey Shelton,  journalist
 Inger Vandyke, photojournalist, on wildlife

See also
 List of photojournalists (Dynamic list by country of origin)
 Lists of journalists
 List of photographers
 National Press Photographers Association

References 

 
Lists of photographers by nationality
Lists of journalists